Jamal Aziz Othman (born 13 August 1986 in Worb, Canton of Bern) is a Swiss former competitive figure skater. He is the 2009 Swiss national champion and a five-time (2002, 2005–2007, 2010) national silver medalist.

Career
Othman began skating at age six after previously trying gymnastics and rock and roll dancing. He was the 1999 Swiss Novice Champion and the 2000 and 2001 Swiss Junior Champion. He qualified for three Junior Grand Prix Finals, withdrawing from one due to a foot injury, and competed four times at Junior Worlds.

In the 2005–2006 season, Othman had to fight to earn his spot on the Swiss Olympic team. Switzerland had two spots to the Olympics, but Othman's silver medal at the Swiss Championships only secured him spots on the teams to Worlds and Europeans. Othman competed at the German Championships, but did not place high enough to qualify for the Olympics. At the European Championships, Othman finished 21st. The Swiss Olympic Committee gave him one last chance and Othman skated his programs in front of a panel. He performed well enough to be placed on the Olympic team. At the Olympics, he failed to make it out of the short program.

Othman began the 2006–2007 season by placing ninth at Skate Canada International. He then went to Trophée Eric Bompard, where he placed 11th. He won his third consecutive silver medal at the Swiss national championships. At the 2007 European Figure Skating Championships, Othman went in as the top-ranked Swiss skater, due to the withdrawal of Stéphane Lambiel. Othman skated two personal best program and cracked the top ten for the first time. His placement, combined with that of countryman Moris Pfeifhofer, ensured Switzerland two spots in the 2008 Championships.

At 186 cm, Othman is very tall for a single skater, and his height allows him to perform rare positions in his spins. He has competed at both French and German nationals to gain competitive experience.

In 2017, Othman married French ice dance coach Romain Haguenauer.

Othman is the managing director of representation agency, Markey International Arts, which works in partnership with the Ice Academy of Montreal.

Programs

Competitive highlights 
GP: Grand Prix; JGP: Junior Grand Prix

References

External links 

Official site

1986 births
Living people
People from Worb
Swiss male single skaters
Figure skaters at the 2006 Winter Olympics
Olympic figure skaters of Switzerland
Figure skaters at the 2007 Winter Universiade
LGBT figure skaters
Gay sportsmen
Competitors at the 2009 Winter Universiade
Sportspeople from the canton of Bern